This is a list of alumni of St. Peter's College, Colombo, Sri Lanka.

References

Saint Peter's College, Colombo alumni

St Peter's